Medical Clinics of North America is a bimonthly peer-reviewed medical journal published by Elsevier. Each issue of the journal contains up-to-date review articles on a specific medical topic. The journal was established in 1915 as the Medical Clinics of Chicago, obtaining its current name in 1917. The editors-in-chief are Douglas S. Paauw (University of Washington School of Medicine) and Edward R. Bollard (Penn State Milton S. Hershey Medical Center). According to the Journal Citation Reports, the journal has a 2016 impact factor of 2.455.

References

External links

Publications established in 1915
Bimonthly journals
English-language journals
Elsevier academic journals
Review journals
General medical journals